The Schwarzes Siepen is a small river in North Rhine-Westphalia, Germany, right tributary of the Lenne.

See also
List of rivers of North Rhine-Westphalia

Rivers of North Rhine-Westphalia
Rivers of Germany